John A. Fraser (November 6, 1840 – May 4, 1908) was a political figure in Nova Scotia. He represented Victoria County in the Nova Scotia House of Assembly from 1874 to 1878 and from 1886 to 1894 as a Liberal member.

He was born on Boularderie Island, Nova Scotia, the only surviving son of the Reverend James Fraser, a missionary for the Church of Scotland. Fraser was educated in Halifax. He was postmaster for Big Bras D'Or and served as a member of the municipal council. In 1865, he married Frances Helen Plant. Fraser did not run for reelection in 1878 and 1882.

References 
The Canadian parliamentary companion, 1889, AJ Gemmill

1840 births
1908 deaths
Nova Scotia Liberal Party MLAs